Imperial Tobacco Company Building, also known as the Marvel Lighting Company Building, is a historic tobacco processing facility located at Mullins, Marion County, South Carolina. It was built between 1908 and 1913 by the Imperial Tobacco Company of Great Britain and Ireland, Inc., and at its construction was the largest redrying plant in Mullins.  It consists of a three-story, brick main block, with stepped parapets and ten additions of varying age. The plant was used to buy, dry, and export tobacco.

It was listed in the National Register of Historic Places in 1984.

References

Commercial buildings on the National Register of Historic Places in South Carolina
Buildings and structures in Marion County, South Carolina
Warehouses on the National Register of Historic Places
Commercial buildings completed in 1913
Industrial buildings and structures on the National Register of Historic Places in South Carolina
National Register of Historic Places in Marion County, South Carolina
Imperial Brands
Tobacco buildings in the United States
1913 establishments in South Carolina